Richland Township is the name of thirteen townships in the U.S. state of Indiana:

 Richland Township, Benton County, Indiana
 Richland Township, DeKalb County, Indiana
 Richland Township, Fountain County, Indiana
 Richland Township, Fulton County, Indiana
 Richland Township, Grant County, Indiana
 Richland Township, Greene County, Indiana
 Richland Township, Jay County, Indiana
 Richland Township, Madison County, Indiana
 Richland Township, Miami County, Indiana
 Richland Township, Monroe County, Indiana
 Richland Township, Rush County, Indiana
 Richland Township, Steuben County, Indiana
 Richland Township, Whitley County, Indiana

Indiana township disambiguation pages